Under heaven may refer to:

 Tianxia, ancient Chinese cultural concept that denoted the entire world
 Under Heaven (novel), novel by Guy Gavriel Kay
 Under Heaven (film), 1998 film